Georgi Atanasov (born 17 February 1947) is a Bulgarian rower. He competed in the men's coxed pair event at the 1968 Summer Olympics.

References

1947 births
Living people
Bulgarian male rowers
Olympic rowers of Bulgaria
Rowers at the 1968 Summer Olympics
Rowers from Sofia